(born June 24, 1969 in Wakkanai, Hokkaido) is a Japanese women's professional shogi player ranked 6-dan. She is a former women's shogi professional major title holder, having won 19 major titles throughout her career, and has been awarded the lifetime title of Queen Meijin, and also was the first women's professional to beat a regular shogi professional in an official game, the first women's professional to win an official game against a Class A professional, and the first women's professional to win a game in the NHK Cup TV Shogi Tournament. 

Nakai also is a former representative director of the Ladies Professional Shogi-player's Association of Japan (LPSA).

Early life
Nakai started playing shogi at the age of 4. In 1983, she entered the Japan Shogi Association's apprentice school and reached the rank of 2-kyū before deciding to leave in 1990.

Women's shogi professional

In 1993, Nakai became the first women's professional to defeat a regular professional in an official game when she beat  in a Ryūō tournament game.

Nakai was 16 years old when she won her first major title in 1985 by defeating the reigning Women's Meijin Naoko Hayashiba three games to one to win the Women's Meijin title. The following year the roles were reversed with Nakai successfully defending her title against the challenger Kobayashi three games to two.

In 2003, Nakai became the first women's professional to win a NHK Cup TV Shogi Tournament game. She won her round 1 game of the 53rd NHK Cup (2003) against Mamoru Hatakeyama and then in round 2 won against Teruichi Aono (who was in Class A at the time). She lost in round 3 to Makoto Nakahara. The following year Nakai also qualified for the 54th NHK Cup (2004) and beat Shūji Satō in round 1. In round 2, Nakai faced Yasumitsu Satō who was the reigning Kisei title holder. Nakai obtained an advantageous position against Satō, but was unable to convert it into a win. Nakai is still the only women's professional to have won a NHK Cup game.

In April 2009, Nakai became the first women's professional to win 500 official games, and then became the first women's professional to win 600 official games in January 2015.

In October 2020, Nakai at 51 years and 3 months old became the oldest challenger for a women's major title when she defeated Sakura Ishimoto in the finals of the challenger tournament for the 28th Kurashiki Tōka Cup. The win advanced Nakai to a women's major title match for the first time in 16 years and it also broke the previous record for oldest title challenger of 49 years and 8 months set two years earlier by Ichiyo Shimizu. Nakai's challenge, however, was unsuccessful as she lost the 48th Kurashiki Tōka Cup title match against Kana Satomi 2 games to none.

Promotion history
Nakai has been promoted as follows.
 2-kyū: April 1, 1981
 1-dan: March 10, 1983
 2-dan: April 1, 1983
 3-dan: April 1, 1986
 4-dan: April 1, 1989
 5-dan: April 1, 1992
 6-dan: November 25, 2002
Note: All ranks are women's professional ranks.

Titles and other championships
Nakai has appeared in major title matches a total of 44 times and has won a total of 19 titles. She has won the Women's Meijin title nine times and has been awarded the title of Queen Meijin. She has also won the  title four times, the  title three times and the Kurashiki Tōka Cup three times. In addition to major titles, Nakai has won 17 other shogi championships.

Major titles

Other championships

Note: Tournaments marked with an asterisk (*) are no longer held or currently suspended.

Awards and honors
Nakai received a number of Japan Shogi Association Annual Shogi Awards and other awards in recognition of her accomplishments in shogi and contributions made to Japanese society.

Annual Shogi Awards
13th Annual Awards (April 1985March 1986): Women's Professional Award
14th Annual Awards (April 1986March 1987): Women's Professional Award
16th Annual Awards (April 1888March 1989): Women's Professional Award
20th Annual Awards (April 1992March 1993): Women's Professional Award
27th Annual Awards (April 1999March 2000): Women's Professional Award
29th Annual Awards (April 2001March 2002): Women's Professional of the Year 
30th Annual Awards (April 2002March 2003): Women's Professional of the Year
31st Annual Awards (April 2003March 2004): Women's Professional Award
22nd Annual Awards (April 2004March 2005): Women's Professional Award
38th Annual Awards (April 2010March 2011): Women's Professional Most Games Played
40th Annual Awards (April 2012March 2012): Women's Professional Most Games Played

Other awards
1986, February: Wakkanai, Hokkaido Meritorious Citizen Award

LPSA representative director
Nakai was selected to be the first representative director of The Ladies Professional Shogi-player's Association of Japan (LPSA) after it was established in 2007, and served in that capacity until 2010.

Personal life
Nakai is married to retired shogi professional . The couple have three daughters. She served as a member of the Warabi, Saitama board of education from 2003 to 2015 and was named a "Warabi City PR Ambassador" in May 2016.

Gallery

References

External links
Ladies Professional Shogi-players' Association of Japan official profile page 
Japan Shogi Association official profile page  (archived version dated March 11, 2007)

Japanese shogi players
Living people
Women's professional shogi players
LPSA
Professional shogi players from Hokkaido
1969 births
Women's Meijin
Women's Ōshō
Women's Ōi
Kurashiki Tōka Cup